St Hilda's Anglican School for Girls is an Australian independent non-selective Anglican single-sex primary and secondary day and boarding school for girls, located in Mosman Park, a western suburb of Perth, Western Australia. In addition, the school provides co-educational early learning education to both girls and boys.

Established in Claremont in 1896, the school currently caters for approximately 1,200 students from Early Learning, through Junior Kindergarten to Year 12, including 150 boarders in Years 7 to 12.

St Hilda's is affiliated with the Association of Heads of Independent Schools of Australia (AHISA), the Junior School Heads Association of Australia (JSHAA), the Australian Boarding Schools' Association (ABSA), the Alliance of Girls' Schools Australasia (AGSA), and is a member of the Independent Girls' Schools Sports Association (IGSSA).

St Hilda's brother school is Christ Church Grammar School located in Claremont.

Sister and brother schools 
St Hilda's has a sister and brother school partnership with the following schools:
Christ Church Grammar School
Hangzhou Foreign Language School

See also

 Anglican education in Australia
 List of schools in the Perth metropolitan area
 List of boarding schools in Australia
 Notable Alumni

References

Further reading

External links
 St Hilda's Anglican School for Girls

Girls' schools in Western Australia
Educational institutions established in 1896
Anglican primary schools in Perth, Western Australia
Boarding schools in Western Australia
Junior School Heads Association of Australia Member Schools in Western Australia
Anglican secondary schools in Perth, Western Australia
Alliance of Girls' Schools Australasia
1896 establishments in Australia